Makanza or Mankanza Territory is an administrative area in Équateur Province in the Democratic Republic of the Congo. It lies along the main channel of the Congo River. Headquarters for the territory is the town of Makanza. the territory was created by presidential order on 6 October 1976.

In the early 21st century bandits operated in the area.

Climate
The average temperature is between 23° and 25° Celsus. The average annual rainfall is between 1700 mm and 1900 mm.

Administrative divisions
In addition to the town of Makanza, officially a commune, the territory is divided into three sectors:
Bangala, with four groupings (groupements) of 34 villages;
Mweko, with two groupings (groupements) of 21 villages;
Ndobo, with four groupings (groupements) of 17 villages.

Towns
The main towns are:
Bolombo
Mabanga
Makanza, HQ
Malele
Malundja
Mobeka
Lusenge

Notes and references

Territories of Équateur Province